The 2019 Challenger La Manche was a professional tennis tournament played on indoor hard courts. It was the 26th edition of the tournament which was part of the 2019 ATP Challenger Tour. It took place in Cherbourg, France between 11 and 17 February 2019.

Singles main-draw entrants

Seeds

 1 Rankings are as of 4 February 2019.

Other entrants
The following players received wildcards into the singles main draw:
  Antoine Cornut Chauvinc
  Laurent Lokoli
  Nicolas Mahut
  Matteo Martineau
  Clément Tabur

The following players received entry into the singles main draw as alternates:
  Andrés Artuñedo
  Alexandre Müller

The following players received entry into the singles main draw using their ITF World Tennis Ranking:
  Javier Barranco Cosano
  Raúl Brancaccio
  Baptiste Crepatte
  Roman Safiullin

The following players received entry from the qualifying draw:
  Riccardo Bonadio
  Manuel Guinard

Champions

Singles

 Ugo Humbert def.  Steve Darcis 6–7(6–8), 6–3, 6–3.

Doubles

 Robert Galloway /  Nathaniel Lammons def.  Javier Barranco Cosano /  Raúl Brancaccio 4–6, 7–6(7–4), [10–8].

External links
Official Website

2019 ATP Challenger Tour
2019
2019 in French tennis
February 2019 sports events in France